Ammiel Hirsch (also spelled Amiel Hirsch) (born 1959) is an American Reform rabbi and attorney. He is the senior rabbi of Stephen Wise Free Synagogue and former executive director of the Association of Reform Zionists of America/World Union for Progressive Judaism, North America. In 2018, The Jerusalem Post named him among “The 50 Most Influential Jews of the Year.” In 2016, City & State New York magazine praised him as  “the borough's most influential voice” for Manhattan's more than 300,000 Jews, and, in 2015, the New York Observer named him among “New York’s Most Influential Religious Leaders.”

Early life and education
Hirsch was born in the United States to Rabbi Richard G. Hirsch (born 1926), a Reform rabbi who founded the movement's Religious Action Center in Washington, D.C., and Executive Director Emeritus of the World Union for Progressive Judaism. His mother is Bella Hirsch; he has two brothers and a sister.

Hirsch spent his high school years in Israel and served in the IDF as a tank commander.  He speaks fluent Hebrew. He went on to earn an LL.B. Honors from the London School of Economics and Political Science and was admitted to the New York State Bar in 1985. He received rabbinical ordination from Hebrew Union College-Jewish Institute of Religion, New York, in 1989.

Reform leadership
From 1992–2004, Hirsch served as executive director of the Association of Reform Zionists of America (ARZA), the Israeli arm of the North American Reform movement. An ardent Zionist, he guided ARZA to accept a new platform embracing Zionism in 1997. He was also a leader in the struggle against Israel's Orthodox religious establishment—which he called "the monopoly"—to recognize the Reform movement in Israel, and was influential in the successful lobbying effort to change Israel's Law of Return to recognize conversions performed by non-Orthodox rabbis in Israel.

In 2004, he joined Stephen Wise Free Synagogue as Senior Rabbi.

Hirsch is also an officer of the New York Board of Rabbis and a member of Partnership of Faith, an interfaith body of New York religious leaders. He lives in New York City.

Book collaboration
In 2000, a literary agent introduced Hirsch to Rabbi Yaakov Yosef Reinman, an Orthodox rabbi and Talmudic scholar, with the idea of collaborating on a book airing the Reform and Orthodox viewpoints on various issues. Their email correspondence over the next 18 months resulted in the book One People, Two Worlds: A Reform rabbi and an Orthodox rabbi explore the issues that divide them. The book was hailed by the religious left as a breakthrough in Orthodox recognition of religious pluralism, but generated criticism in Orthodox circles regarding Rabbi Reinman's willingness to conduct official rabbinic dialogue with a Reform clergyman. The book was denounced by the Moetzes Gedolei HaTorah of Agudath Israel of America and the heads of Beth Medrash Govoha, Lakewood, New Jersey, where Reinman received his rabbinic ordination. Reinman subsequently pulled out of a 14-city promotional tour after two appearances, leaving Hirsch to continue the tour on his own.

Bibliography

References

External links
Rabbi Ammiel Hirsch free downloads
The Jewish State: The next fifty years – an interview with Rabbi Ammiel Hirsch
Letter to the Editor of The New York Times by Ammiel Hirsch, 21 October 2004

American Reform rabbis
American Reform Jews
American Zionists
American chief executives
Hebrew Union College – Jewish Institute of Religion alumni
Rabbis from New York City
Living people
1959 births
20th-century American rabbis
21st-century American rabbis
Reform Zionists